The Provisional Revolutionary Government of the Republic of South Vietnam (PRG), was formed on June 8, 1969, by North Vietnam as a purportedly independent shadow government that opposed the government of the Republic of Vietnam (South Vietnam) under President Nguyễn Văn Thiệu and then as a country after the Fall of Saigon with the name Republic of South Vietnam from 30 April 1975 to 2 July 1976. Delegates of the National Liberation Front of South Vietnam (the Viet Cong), as well as several smaller groups, participated in its creation.

The PRG was recognized as the government of South Vietnam by most socialist states. It signed the 1973 Paris Peace Treaty as an independent entity, that was separate from both South Vietnam and North Vietnam. It became the nominal government of South Vietnam as the Republic of South Vietnam following the Fall of Saigon on 30 April 1975. On 2 July 1976, the Republic of South Vietnam and North Vietnam (Democratic Republic of Vietnam) merged to form the Socialist Republic of Vietnam.

History
The Provisional Revolutionary Government was preceded by the Vietnam Alliance of National, Democratic, and Peaceful Forces (VANDPF) made up of anti-government forces and headed by Trinh Dinh Thao. The Alliance was a collection of individuals who wanted a new South Vietnamese government but disagreed with the ever-present Northern Communist presence.

There had been talk of setting up an Alliance as early as 1966, but this was halted when South Vietnamese intelligence operatives arrested an influential anti-government organizer, Ba Tra. Ba Tra gave the South Vietnamese government extensive information on anti-government forces working in the city. This setback was compounded by his identification of one of the key cadre in the financial division.

Under torture, Ba Tra identified more figures in the underground, who were then arrested. By 1967, the entire Saigon organization had been sent further underground. The Tet Offensive during 1968 triggered a wave of oppression, forcing many people into the forests and mountains. These peoplebusinessmen, middle class, doctors and other professionals started The Alliance.

The then-new American president, Richard Nixon, started a process of Vietnamization to allow the American Armed Forces to withdraw from Vietnam. One of the tenets of Vietnamization was responsible government in South Vietnam. To prevent the Americans from installing their own government, a conference was held on June 6–8, 1969, off Route 22 in Cambodia's Fishhook region.

1969–1975 
The Alliance as well as other groups met and formed the Provisional Revolutionary Government on June 8, 1969. According to Justice Minister Trương Như Tảng, the new group's main purpose was to help the Vietcong "acquire a new international stature."

There were delegates from the Vietcong, the VANDPF, the People's Revolutionary Party (the South Vietnamese communist party) and "the usual assortment of mass organizations, ethnic groups, and geopolitical regions." Banners displayed prominently at the convention proclaimed that "South Vietnam is independent, democratic, peaceful, and neutral".

The PRG reflected a number of nationalist, anti-imperialist and communist political viewpoints, including those of the Vietnam Workers Party (the North Vietnamese communist party). Following the military and political results of the 1968 Tet Offensive and related military offensives in the South by Saigon and America, in which the Vietcong suffered serious military losses, the PRG was envisioned as a political counter-force that could influence international public opinion in support of reunification and in opposition to the United States and South Vietnam.

The declared purpose of the PRG was to provide a formal governmental structure to the Vietcong and enhance its claim of representing "the Southern people". Included in this strategy was the pursuit of a negotiated settlement to the war leading to reunification, organized during the initial phase of Vietnamization.

During the period 1969–70, most of the PRG's cabinet ministries operated near the Cambodian border. Starting on March 29 to late April 1970, the US and South Vietnamese offensives forced the PRG to flee deeper into Cambodia. The stressful escape caused many of the PRG officials (such as Trương Như Tạng) to need extensive medical furloughs. After Trương Như Tạng returned, he noticed that new cadres from the north were causing problems for the non-communist members of the PRG. One member in particular, Ba Cap, harshly denounced most of the PRG as bourgeois. Tạng complained to the higher members of the North Vietnamese government, but was rebuffed. Tạng later saw this as the point when the PRG turned from being an independent South Vietnam-based alternative government to being a mouthpiece for Northern Vietnamese communists.

The central bodies of the PRG functioned as a provisional government. The PRG maintained diplomatic relations with many countries of the Non-Aligned Movement, such as Algeria and SFR Yugoslavia as well as with the Soviet Union and the People's Republic of China.

1975–1976 
After the surrender of Saigon on 30 April 1975, the PRG assumed power in the South and subsequently participated in the reunification of Vietnam.

According to professor Long Vinh Ngo (University of Maine), mid-July 1975, the delegates of the Democratic Republic of Vietnam (Nguyễn Văn Lưu) and the Republic of South Vietnam (Đinh Bá Thi) applied to join the United Nations as two independent member states. On 11 August 1975, the United Nations Security Council introduced a referendum on reunification, which passed. The two Vietnamese countries eventually reunited on 2 July 1976.

Culture

Music
The national anthem of the Government was Liberate the South. The song was written in 1961 by Lưu Hữu Phước (1921–1989) and adopted at that time as the anthem of the National Front for the Liberation of Vietnam.

In 1966, Lưu Hữu Phước wrote a military song  as a propaganda to encourage the soldiers going to attack in Saigon in the Tet Offensive. The song was spread again during the fall of Saigon.

Photos

Cabinet

See also
 Vietnam War
 Geneva Accords

Footnotes

References

Citations

Sources

External links
 Provisional Revolutionary Government of South Vietnam (1969–1975)
 "Ethnic Music" Room ("Words" is Japanese version only.)
 Rulers (Vietnam)
 WORLD STATESMEN, Vietnam (including South Vietnam)

South Vietnam
Communism in Vietnam
Former countries in Vietnamese history
Former polities of the Indochina Wars
Vietnam
1969 establishments in Vietnam
1975 establishments in Vietnam
1976 disestablishments in Vietnam
States and territories established in 1969
States and territories disestablished in 1976
Provisional governments